

Super League Malaysia

The 2006-07 Premier League season, the third season since its establishment on 2004, started on December 3, 2005.

League table

Pld = Matches played; W = Matches won; D = Matches drawn; L = Matches lost; F = Goals for; A = Goals against; GD = Goal difference; Pts = Points